AC927 or 1-(2-phenylethyl)piperidine is a selective sigma receptor antagonist, with reported binding affinity of Ki = 30 ± 2 nM for the sigma-1 receptor and Ki = 138 ± 18 nM for the sigma-2 receptor, and negligible binding affinity for other major central nervous system receptors, transporters, and ion channels.

AC927 is reported to attenuate the locomotor stimulation induced by methamphetamine in mice.

References

1-Piperidinyl compounds
Phenyl compounds